Hans-Jürgen Wloka (born September 12, 1951) is a German former footballer who spent 3 seasons in the Bundesliga with Borussia Mönchengladbach and Bayer Uerdingen.

Honours
 Bundesliga champion: 1971.

External links
 

1951 births
Living people
German footballers
Borussia Mönchengladbach players
Arminia Bielefeld players
KFC Uerdingen 05 players
Rot-Weiß Oberhausen players
Bundesliga players
Association football midfielders
20th-century German people